Thelasis carinata, commonly known as the triangular fly orchid, is a plant in the orchid family. It is a clump-forming epiphyte or lithophyte that lacks pseudobulbs. There are groups of between two and six erect, flattened stems each with up to six leaves that have a ridged lower surface. Up to fifteen green and white flowers are arranged on a thin but stiff flowering stem. This orchid is found from Thailand to the southwest Pacific.

Description
The leaves have a ridge on their lower side and their lower end sheaths the stem. The flowers are self-pollinating, tube-shaped near their bases and have an ovary that is triangular in cross section. Flowering occurs between April and June.

Taxonomy and naming
Thelasis carinata was first formally described in 1825 by Carl Ludwig Blume who published the description in Bijdragen tot de flora van Nederlandsch Indië. The specific epithet (carinata) is a Latin word meaning "keeled".

Distribution and habitat
The triangular fly orchid usually grows on rocks and trees in humid, well-lit situations. It is found in Thailand, Borneo, Java, the Lesser Sunda Islands, Peninsular Malaysia, Maluku Islands, the Philippines, Sulawesi, Sumatra New Guinea, the Solomon Islands, Queensland, Australia, New Caledonia and Samoa. In Queensland it occurs between the Iron Range and McIlwraith Range.

References

carinata
Plants described in 1825
Flora of Christmas Island
Orchids of Indonesia
Orchids of Papua New Guinea
Orchids of the Philippines
Orchids of Malaysia
Orchids of Queensland
Orchids of New Caledonia